Beginner Books is the Random House imprint for young children ages 3–9, co-founded by Phyllis Cerf with Ted Geisel, more often known as Dr. Seuss, and his wife Helen Palmer Geisel. Their first book was Dr. Seuss's The Cat in the Hat (1957), whose title character appears in the brand's logo. Cerf compiled a list of 379 words as the basic vocabulary for young readers, along with another 20 slightly harder "emergency" words. No more than 200 words were taken from that list to write The Cat in the Hat.  Subsequent books in the series were modeled on the same requirement.

Beginner Books had only four titles in their catalog in 1958. Two years later, they were earning 1 million dollars a year. Random House acquired Beginner Books in 1960 and was the largest publisher of children's books in the United States.

Early contributors

Authors
When Theodor Seuss Geisel illustrated his own stories, he wrote as Dr. Seuss. When others created the illustrations, he used either the pseudonym Theo LeSieg or Rosetta Stone. Other authors of early Beginner Books were Robert M. Lopshire, Bennett Cerf, Al Perkins, Helen Palmer Geisel who wrote as Helen Palmer, Philip Dey Eastman, Stan and Jan Berenstain, Benjamin Elkin and Marion Holland.

Illustrators
Early Beginner Books employed many famous illustrators, including the aforementioned Theodor Seuss Geisel, P. D. Eastman, Stan and Jan Berenstain, and Robert Lopshire. Roy McKie was also an illustrator.

List of Beginner Books

Beginner Books that are not numbered
And to Think That I Saw It on Mulberry Street (1937/1964, Dr. Seuss) (Grolier Enterprises only)
A Day at the Seashore (1951/2017, Kathryn Jackson, Byron Jackson and Corinne Malvern) (Early Moments only)
Nurse Nancy (1958/2016, Kathryn Jackson and Corinne Malvern) (Early Moments only)
The Cat in the Hat Dictionary (U.K. reissue edition)/The Cat in the Hat Beginner Book Dictionary (1964/2007, Dr. Seuss on the U.K. reissue [writing as the Cat himself on the worldwide issue] and P. D. Eastman [uncredited on the U.K. reissue]) – Note: in 2007, this book was additionally written and illustrated by Peter Eastman.
The Cat in the Hat Songbook (1967, Dr. Seuss) (out of print) – Note: this book was re-released in 1993 as a normal Dr. Seuss book.
The Early Bird (1968/2000, Richard Scarry) (Grolier and Early Moments only)
My Book about Me (1969, ME, Myself with some little help from my friends, Dr. Seuss and Roy McKie) (Grolier and Early Moments only) – Note: this book was re-released as a By ME, Myself book in the 21st century.
I Can Draw It Myself (1970/2017, ME, Myself with a little help from my friend, Dr. Seuss) (out of print) – Note: this book was re-released in other editions and later added new pages in the 2017 edition as a By ME, Myself book in May 2017.
Some of Us Walk, Some Fly, Some Swim (1971, Michael Frith) (out of print)
The Berenstain Bears in: The Bears' Almanac (1973, Stan and Jan Berenstain) (out of print)
The Cat's Quizzer (1976, Dr. Seuss) (Grolier and Early Moments only) – Note: this book became a special edition in 1993 as B-75
The Best Mistake Ever! and Other Stories (1984/1993, Richard Scarry) (Grolier and Early Moments only)
Beginning Readers' Yearbook 1994 (1994) (Grolier Book Club)
P. J. Funnybunny Camps Out (1994, Marilyn Sadler and Roger Bollen) (Grolier and Early Moments only)
Samantha the Snob (1994/2018, Kathryn Cristaldi and Denise Brunkus) (Early Moments only)
Glasses for D.W. (1995/1996, Marc Brown) (Grolier and Early Moments only)
Arthur's Reading Race (1996/1997, Marc Brown) (Grolier and Early Moments only)
Put Me in the Alphabet!: A Beginner Workbook About ABC's (1997, Robert Lopshire) (out of print)
I Want to Count Something New!: A Beginner Workbook About 123's (1997, Robert Lopshire) (out of print) – his final work before his death in 2002
Arthur Tricks the Tooth Fairy (1998/1999, Marc Brown) (Grolier and Early Moments only)
Pie Rats Ahoy! (1998/2000, Richard Scarry) (Grolier and Early Moments only)
Dinosaur Days (1998/2015, Joyce Milton and Franco Tempesta) (Early Moments only)
Pigs of a Feather (1998, Tish Rabe and K. Klimo/unreleased) (out of print)
Match This, P. J. Funnybunny!: A Beginner Workbook About Matching and Sorting (1998, Marilyn Sadler and Roger Bollen) (out of print)
What's Next, P. J. Funnybunny?: A Beginner Workbook About Sequencing (1998, Marilyn Sadler and Roger Bollen) (out of print)
Pretty Penny Comes Up Short (2012/2018, Devon Kinch) (Early Moments only)
Frosty the Snowman: Snow Day! (2014/2017, Courtney Carbone) (Early Moments only)
Elephant Joe, Brave Firefighter! (2015/2017, David Wojtowycz) (Early Moments only)
I Am Kind: A Positive Powerful Story (2016/2020, Suzy Capozzi and Eren Unten) (Early Moments only)
A Little Princess (2017/2018, Andrea Posner-Sanchez and Lorena Alvarez) (Early Moments only)
DreamWorks' Trolls: Too Many Cupcakes (2018, David Newman, Fabio Laguna and Grace Mills)
DC Super Friends: Catch That Crook (2018, Laura Hitchcock, Elisabetta Melaranci and Guilia Priori)
What Pet Should I Get? (2015/2019, Dr. Seuss [told in Jay's own words]) – Note: this was a special edition without behind the pages and picking any pet in the Beginner Book special.
Dr. Seuss's 123 (2019, Dr. Seuss [uncredited])
Can You See Me? (2019, Bob Staake)
A Skunk in My Bunk! (2019, Christopher Cerf and Nicola Slater)
Shut the Door! (1993/2020, Robert Lopshire [told in the little bear's own words] and Maria Karipidou) – in 2020, this book was solely illustrated by Maria Karipidou in the special edition in the Beginner Book that was not numbered
If I Had Your Vote (2020, the Cat in the Hat and Tom Brannon with a little help from Alastair Heim)
The Pink Book (2020, Diane Muldrow and Mike Yamada)
A Ticket for Cricket (2021, Molly Coxe)
If I Ran Your School (2021, the Cat in the Hat and Tom Brannon with a little help from Alastair Heim)
I Can Be Anything! (2021, Bob Staake)
It's Better Being a Bunny (2022, Marilyn Sadler and Tim Bowers)
Busy Street (2022, Edward Miller)
If I Were Saint Nick: A Christmas Story (2022, the Cat in the Hat and Tom Brannon with a little help from Alastair Heim)
How to Love a Pony (2023, Michelle Meadows and Sawyer Cloud)

The Big Books of Beginner Books
The Big Blue Book of Beginner Books (1994) Put Me in the Zoo/A Fly Went By/Are You My Mother?/Go, Dog. Go!/The Best Nest/It's Not Easy Being a Bunny
The Big Red Book of Beginner Books (1995) I Want To Be Somebody New!/Sam and the Firefly/Stop That Ball!/Robert the Rose Horse/The Digging-est Dog/The Very Bad Bunny
The Big Book of Berenstain Bears Beginner Books (1996) The Big Honey Hunt/The Bears' Picnic/The Bear Scouts/The Bear Detectives/The Missing Dinosaur Bone/The Bike Lesson (out of print)
The Big Green Book of Beginner Books (1997) Great Day for Up/Would You Rather Be a Bullfrog?/I Wish That I Had Duck Feet/Wacky Wednesday/Maybe You Should Fly a Jet!/I Am Not Going to Get Up Today! (Note: This is the last Dr. Seuss book where Geisel did not illustrate.)
The Big Book of Berenstain Bears Beginner Books (2011) The Bike Lesson/The Bears' Picnic/The Bears' Vacation/Bears in the Night/The Berenstain Bears and the Spooky Old Tree/The Berenstain Bears and the Missing Dinosaur Bone
My Big Book of Beginner Books about Me (2011) The Foot Book/The Eye Book/The Ear Book/The Nose Book/The Tooth Book/The Knee Book (Note: Only Beginner Book collection without Beginner Books.)
The Big Purple Book of Beginner Books (2012) A Fish Out of Water/Snow/I'll Teach My Dog 100 Words/Flap Your Wings/Big Dog...Little Dog/Fred and Ted Go Camping (Note: P. D. Eastman's final work after his death in early 1986)
The Big Book of Thomas the Tank Engine Beginner Books (2013) Stop Train Stop/A Crack in the Track/Go Train Go/Blue Train Green Train/Trains, Cranes and Troublesome Trucks/Fast Train Slow Train
The Big Orange Book of Beginner Books (2015) Ten Apples Up On Top!/In a People House/Marvin K. Mooney Will You Please Go Now!/The Shape of Me and Other Stuff/Because a Little Bug Went Ka-Choo!/Hooper Humperdink...? Not Him! (Notes: this is the only Beginner Book collection with two Beginner Books and four Bright and Early Books instead of four Beginner Books and two Bright and Early Books. Also, Roy McKie's final work after his death.)
The Big Aqua Book of Beginner Books (2017) The Cat in the Hat Comes Back/There's a Wocket in My Pocket!/New Tricks I Can Do/Hand Hand Fingers Thumb/Please Try to Remember the First of Octember!/Oh Say Can You Say? (Note: Al Perkins, Robert Lopshire, Eric Gurney and Art Cummings' last works after their death in 1975, 2002, 1992 and 2012.)
The Big Violet Book of Beginner Books (2023) What Pet Should I Get?/Come over to My House/If I Ran Your School/Dr. Seuss's Book of Colors/Dr. Seuss's Book of Animals/Dr. Seuss's 123

Book Club
Grolier Book Club Beginner Book Series
Scholastic Book Club Beginner Book Series
Early Moments Book Club Beginner Book Series

Bright and Early Books for Beginning Beginners
The following books are for younger children and are technically part of the series. The "BE" designation stands for Bright and Early.

Bright and Early Books that are not numbered
The Little Red Caboose (1953/2016, Marian Potter and Tibor Gergely) (Early Moments only)
I Can Write! (1971, ME, Myself with a little help from Dr. Seuss [as Theo. LeSieg] and Roy McKie) (Grolier and Early Moments only)
Sleepy Dog (1984/1993, Harriet Ziefert and Norman Gorbaty) (Grolier and Early Moments only)
Cat Traps (1996/1998, Molly Coxe) (Grolier and Early Moments only)
Dr. Seuss's Book of Animals (2018, Dr. Seuss [uncredited])
Dr. Seuss's Book of Colors (2018, Dr. Seuss [uncredited])
Cooking with Sam-I-Am (2018/2019, Courtney Carbone and Tom Brannon) (Early Moments only)

The Big Book of Bright and Early Book Stories
The Big Book of Berenstain Bears Stories (2016) Inside, Outside, Upside Down/Bears on Wheels/The Berenstain Bears on the Moon/Old Hat, New Hat/He Bear, She Bear/The Bear Scouts/The Bear Detectives: The Case of the Missing Pumpkin

Book Club
Grolier Bright and Early Book series
Scholastic Bright and Early Book series
Early Moments Bright and Early Book series

Bright and Early Board Books
Most, if not all, of these books are abridged versions of Beginner Books or Bright and Early Books. These books are not numbered.

The Alphabet Book by P. D. Eastman, additional materials by Peter Eastman
I'll Teach My Dog a Lot of Words written by Michael Frith, illustrated by P. D. Eastman
Big Dog...Little Dog by P. D. Eastman
Are You My Mother? by P. D. Eastman
Eres mi Mama? by P. D. Eastman
Go, Dog. Go! P.D. Eastman's Book of Things That Go illustrated by P. D. Eastman
Ve, Perro. Ve! by P. D. Eastman
Fred and Ted Like to Fly by Peter Eastman
The Snowman illustrated by Raymond Briggs – Note: the only Bright and Early Board Book without any words
What Time Is It? by P. D. Eastman (eBook only)
The Berenstain Bears: Old Hat, New Hat by the Berenstains
Sombrero Viejo, Sombrero Nuevo by the Berenstains (out of print)
The Berenstain Bears: Inside, Outside, Upside Down by the Berenstains
The Berenstain Bears: He Bear, She Bear by the Berenstains
Summer by Alice Low, illustrated by Roy McKie
Put Me In The Zoo: A Book of Colors by Robert Lopshire
Stop, Train, Stop! by Rev. W. Awdry
Para, Trencito, Para! by Rev. W. Awdry (out of print)
Blue Train, Green Train by Rev. W. Awdry
Dr. Seuss's ABC: An Amazing Alphabet Book! by Dr. Seuss
Fox In Socks: Dr. Seuss's Book of Tongue Twisters by Dr. Seuss
Hop on Pop by Dr. Seuss
Ten Apples Up On Top! by Dr. Seuss (writing as Theo. LeSieg), illustrated by Roy McKie – Note: this book is a 1998 recolor edition.
There's a Wocket in My Pocket! Dr. Seuss's Book of Ridiculous Rhymes by Dr. Seuss
Oh, the Thinks You Can Think! by Dr. Seuss
Mr. Brown Can Moo! Can You? Dr. Seuss's Book of Wonderful Noises by Dr. Seuss
The Shape of Me and Other Stuff: Dr. Seuss's Surprising Word Book by Dr. Seuss
Would You Rather Be a Bullfrog? by Dr. Seuss (writing as Theo. LeSieg), illustrated by Roy McKie
The Many Mice of Mr. Brice by Dr. Seuss (writing as Theo. LeSieg), illustrated by Roy McKie
The Ear Book by Al Perkins, illustrated by Henry Payne
Hand, Hand, Fingers, Thumb by Al Perkins, illustrated by Eric Gurney
The Nose Book by Al Perkins, illustrated by Joe Mathieu
The Tooth Book by Dr. Seuss (writing as Theo. LeSieg), illustrated by Joe Mathieu
The Eye Book by Dr. Seuss (writing as Theo. LeSieg), illustrated by Joe Mathieu
The Foot Book: Dr. Seuss's Wacky Book of Opposites by Dr. Seuss

Big Bright and Early Board Books

Fast Train, Slow Train by Rev W. Awdry
Would You Rather Be a Bullfrog? by Dr. Seuss (writing as Theo. LeSieg), illustrated by Roy McKie
Dr. Seuss's ABC: An Amazing Alphabet Book! by Dr. Seuss
The Berenstain Bears and the Spooky Old Tree by Stan and Jan Berenstain
Oh, the Thinks You Can Think! by Dr. Seuss
Mr. Brown Can Moo! Can You?: Dr. Seuss's Book of Wonderful Noises by Dr. Seuss
Trains, Cranes and Troublesome Trucks by Rev W. Awdry
The Many Mice of Mr. Brice by Dr. Seuss (writing as Theo. LeSieg), illustrated by Roy McKie
Fox in Socks: Dr. Seuss's Book of Tongue Twisters by Dr. Seuss
Are You My Mother? written and illustrated by P. D. Eastman
Hop on Pop: The Simplest Seuss for Toddlers Use by Dr. Seuss
Go, Dog. Go!: P. D. Eastman's Book of Things That Go by P. D. Eastman
The Big Box of Bright and Early Board Books About Me (The Foot Book: Dr. Seuss's Wacky Book of Opposites, The Eye Book, The Nose Book, The Tooth Book)
The Eye Book by Dr. Seuss (writing as Theo. LeSieg), illustrated by Joe Mathieu
The Foot Book: Dr. Seuss's Wacky Book of Opposites by Dr. Seuss
Hand, Hand, Fingers, Thumb by Al Perkins, illustrated by Eric Gurney
The Tooth Book by Dr. Seuss (writing as Theo. LeSieg), illustrated by Joe Mathieu
The Nose Book by Al Perkins, illustrated by Joe Mathieu
There's a Wocket in My Pocket!: Dr. Seuss's Book of Ridiculous Rhymes by Dr. Seuss
The Berenstain Bears: Inside, Outside, Upside Down by Stan and Jan Berenstain (Kohl's-exclusive)
The Alphabet Book by P.D. Eastman, additional materials by Peter Eastman (Kohl's-exclusive)
Put Me in the Zoo: A Book of Colors by Robert Lopshire (Kohl's-exclusive)

See also
 Ladybird Books

References

External links 

List of the first 50 Beginner Books at Children's Picture Book Price Guide
kids@Random (catalog download page)

Book publishing companies based in New York (state)
Companies based in New York City
Random House
Publishing companies established in 1957
Children's book publishers
Dr. Seuss
1957 establishments in New York City
American companies established in 1957